Satya Harishchandra is a 1943 Indian Kannada-language film directed by R. Nagendra Rao. It stars Subbaiah Naidu, Lakshmibai and Rao. The music of the film was composed by R. Sudarshanam. The film was successful at the box office and ran for 100 days in Dharwad. The movie was dubbed in Tamil making it the first Kannada movie to be dubbed in other language.

Cast 
 Subbaiah Naidu as Harischandra
 R. Nagendra Rao
 Lakshmibai as Chandramathi
 G. V. Krishnamurthy Rao
 M. G. Marirao
 B. S. Raja Iyengar as Narada
 Kamalabai
 Narasimhan (credited as Master Narasimhan)

Soundtrack 
The music of the film was composed by R. Sudarsanam with lyrics for the soundtracks penned by Gamiki Ramakrishna Sastry.

Production and release 
Film producer A. V. Meiyappan went to his hometown of Karaikudi after the success of his 1941 Tamil film Sabapathy due to apprehensions surrounding bombing of Madras by the Japanese with the World War II on. He returned to Madras and began the production of Satya Harishchandra as a joint venture with the theatre troupe SSS Natakamandali. R. Nagendra Rao was roped in to direct and A. T. Krishnaswamy as the assistant director. The cast included Subbaiah Naidu playing the role of the Harischandra, Lakshmibai as Chandramathi; Rao, J. V. Krishnamurthy Rao, M. G. Marirao, Kamalabai and Narasimhan. Musician B. S. Raja Iyengar made his acting debut playing Narada. The edited length of the film was restricted to  due to wartime regulation of raw stock. It was released on 28 May 1943. The film was a commercial success.

The film was dubbed into Tamil and released as Harishchandra on 6 January 1944. It was the first Indian film to be dubbed into another language. A. T. Krishnaswamy wrote the dialogues for the Tamil film while R. Nagendra Rao helped him with the words that would match the artistes' lip movement. V. S. Raghavan was the pioneering sound engineer who dubbed the film.

References

External links 
 
 Satya Harishchandra on Chiloka

1943 films
1940s Kannada-language films
Films about Raja Harishchandra
Indian black-and-white films
Films scored by R. Sudarsanam